The 2008–09 UCI Africa Tour was the fifth season of the UCI Africa Tour. The season began on 2 October 2008 with the Grand Prix Chantal Biya and ended on 19 April 2009 with the Tour du Maroc.

The points leader, based on the cumulative results of previous races, wears the UCI Africa Tour cycling jersey. Nicholas White of South Africa was the defending champion of the 2007–08 UCI Africa Tour. Dan Craven of Namibia was crowned as the 2008–09 UCI Africa Tour champion.

Throughout the season, points are awarded to the top finishers of stages within stage races and the final general classification standings of each of the stages races and one-day events. The quality and complexity of a race also determines how many points are awarded to the top finishers, the higher the UCI rating of a race, the more points are awarded.
The UCI ratings from highest to lowest are as follows:
 Multi-day events: 2.HC, 2.1 and 2.2
 One-day events: 1.HC, 1.1 and 1.2

Events

2008

2009

Final standings

Individual classification

Team classification

Nation classification

Nation under-23 classification

External links
 

UCI Africa Tour

2009 in African sport
2008 in African sport